The Most Holy Trinity Cathedral Parish, also called Talibon Cathedral, is a religious building of the Catholic Church located at Barangay Poblacion, Talibon, in the Central Visayas province of Bohol, Philippines.

The cathedral follows the Roman or Latin rite and functions as the headquarters of Diocese of Talibon (Dioecesis Talibonensis) that was created on January 9, 1986 during the papacy of Pope John Paul II. It is under the pastoral responsibility of the Bishop Daniel Patrick Y. Parcon since 2014.

History
On the night of May 1, 1521 in present-day Cebu, the remaining Spaniards after the Battle of Mactan four days earlier, fell into an attack organized by the locals. The lay missionaries aboard Trinidad left the ship as it is continuously attacked, and paddled to the Talibon-Jetafe area for safety. They married local people in the area and subsequently introduced them to Christianity. Talibon then was dedicated to the Most Holy Trinity (Santissima Trinidad), the namesake of their ship. In 1596, members of the Society of Jesus arrived in Bohol to put up parish missions in the island and noticed that lay missions were already active in the area, particularly in Talibon where Magellan's men took refuge in 1521.

The Jesuit mission founded the parish of Talibon in 1722. Construction of the stone church was spearheaded by the Recollects in 1852 under the administration of Lorenzo Mayor. The cathedral's bell tower was added under the helm of Jose Sanchez, who served the area from 1868-1875, and the entire edifice was fully-finished in 1899.  The church of Talibon became a cathedral when the diocese was founded in 1986 and is considered as the cradle of Christianity in the province.

References

External links
 Facebook page  

Spanish Colonial architecture in the Philippines
Roman Catholic churches in Bohol
Roman Catholic cathedrals in the Philippines
1722 establishments in the Spanish Empire
19th-century Roman Catholic church buildings in the Philippines